Kelaa may refer to:

 Kelaa (Haa Alif Atoll), Maldives
 El Kelaa des Sraghna, Morocco